The 2012 Critérium International, was the 81st running of the Critérium International cycling stage race.

Schedule

Teams

Stages

Stage 1
24 March 2012 – Porto-Vecchio to Porto-Vecchio, 89.5 km

Stage 2
24 March 2012 – Porto-Vecchio to Porto-Vecchio, 6.5 km

Stage 3
27 March 2012 – Porto-Vecchio to Col de l’Ospedale, 198 km

Classification leadership

Final standings

General classification

Points classification

Mountains classification

Young rider classification

Team classification

References

Critérium International
Criterium International
Criterium International